Curicó Unido is a football club based in Curicó, Maule Region, Chile. They currently play in the Primera División, the first level of the Chilean football system. They are currently managed by Damián Muñoz.

History
Curicó Unido was founded on 26 February 1973, with Edmundo Rojas as the first President of the club.
They became the fourth football team from the Curicó city to play at the professional level, after Alianza de Curicó, Luis Cruz Martínez and Bádminton de Curicó.

Curicó Unido played since the season 1974 at the Primera B, but after seven poor seasons they gained relegation to the third level to the season 1981, returning to Primera B two years later, in 1983.

1984 and 1985 were the best seasons of Curicó Unido history, disputing the promotion until the last week, but with bad luck at the final matches.

The next campaigns were average, with the exception of the season 1990, when they lose the category after the final match with Deportes Valdivia, when they won 4–1, two goals short what they needed to stay at Primera B.

Since then, they stayed at the Tercera División without real chances to return to the Primera B, until the 2003 season. But at the next year that changed.

In 2004 the albirrojos were really close to returned to the Primera B. At the last week of the season, in Chillán, they arrived as leaders, to face Ñublense who was three points behind at the table; however the Chillanejos won that game 2–1, forcing a tie breaker match in Linares, where Ñublense won 2–0, taking the title and the promotion.

However, the year 2005 Curicó Unido had his revenge. They disputed the title with Trasandino until the last week. While Trasandino tied with Municipal Iquique, Curicó crushed Iberia 4–0, and in this way, after 15 years of suffering, Provincial Curicó Unido returned to the Chilean professional football.

In 2006, in their return to the Primera B, Curicó Unido finished in fifth place.

The next year, Curico avoided relegation only at the end of the season; Deportes Temuco finished last and fell down to the third level of national football for the upcoming season.

Curicó won promotion to the Primera Division after a 1–0 win over Deportes Puerto Montt on the last home game of the 2008 season, which was enough to securing 1st place of the Primera B and automatic promotion. Only to return to Primera B the next season, after losing a promotion play-off against San Luis.

They returned to the top-tier in 2017, after winning the 2016–17 Primera B tournament.

Honours
Primera B: 2
2008, 2016–17

Tercera División: 1
2005

Others
Copa Confraternidad : 1
1991

8 seasons in Primera División (2009, 2017– )
26 seasons in Primera B (1974–1980, 1983–1990, 2006–2008, 2010–2016/17)
17 seasons in Tercera División  (1981–1982, 1991–2005)
1 participation in Copa Libertadores (2023)

Records
Record victory (overall) – 14–0 v. Rengo Unido (Tercera División 2004)
Record Primera División victory – 5–0 v. O'Higgins (2022)
Record defeat (overall) – 0–7 v. Universidad Católica (Primera División 2009-C)
Record Copa Chile victory – 9–0 v. Lister Rossel (1974)
Most appearances (overall) – 271, Franco Bechtholdt (2012–2022)
Most goals scored (overall) – 69, Luis Martínez (1983–88)
Most goals scored (Primera División matches)  – 16, Federico Castro (2020, 2022)
Most Primera División appearances – 124, Franco Bechtholdt (2017–2022)
Primera División Best Position  – 3rd (2022)
Copa Chile Best Season – Quarter-finals (2009, 2010, 2017)
Highest home attendance – 8,981 v. Universidad de Chile (14 Jan 1990)

South American cups history

Team colours
Curicó Unido's official kit is a white shirt with a diagonal red stripe that crosses the chest from the right shoulder to the left side of the hip. The shorts are black and socks are white.

Kit evolution

Sponsorship
The club are currently sponsored by Multihogar and their technical sponsors are Dalponte.

Shirt Sponsors
1976: Buses Galgo Azul
1977–78: Cecinas Soler
1981–82: Multifrut 
1983–95: Fideos Suazo
1996–: Multihogar

Stadiums
Curicó Unido's traditional home-ground is the Estadio La Granja, located in Curicó city; an 8,000 football stadium with an athletic track around the pitch, located in the "La Granja sports complex", leased from Curicó city hall.

Curicó Unido have also used other grounds during their history.

The Estadio Carabineros de Curicó, was Curicó Unido's home in 1976 and 1977.

They also played their Tercera Division league home games of the season 1992, at the Estadio ANFA Luis H. Alvarez.

And recently, during the 2010 season, the Estadio Municipal Jorge Silva de San Fernando, was their temporary home ground due to the reconstruction of the Estadio La Granja.

Supporters
Curicó Unido fans traditionally come from Curicó itself; and from the rest of the Curicó Province, but in smaller numbers.

The largest supporters' group is the Marginales, created in 1997.

Curicó Unido supporters' current main rivals are Rangers de Talca, and Ñublense.

Current squad

2023 Summer transfers

In

Out

Managers

  Ricardo Oteíza (1973)
  Julio Campos (1974)
  Eugenio Jara (1974–75)
  Pedro Araya (1975–76)
  Leonardo Bedoya (1976–77)
  Sergio Gutiérrez (1977)
  Pedro Araya (1977–78)
  José González (1978–79)
  Luis Álvarez (1979)
  Sergio Navarro (1979–80)
  Guillermo Páez (1980)
  Luis Álvarez (1981)
  Enrique Arredondo (1982)
  Francisco Quinteros (1983)
  Carlos Contreras (1983)
  Eugenio Horta (1983–84)
  Sergio Gutiérrez (1985)
  Luis Orrego (1985)
  Roque Mercury (1986)
  Guillermo Páez (1986–87)
  Luis Orrego (1987–88)
  Sergio Gutiérrez (1988–90)
  Manuel Rubilar (1990)
  Eugenio Horta (1990–91)
  Julio García (1991)
  Manuel Espinoza (1991–93)
  Julio García (1993)
  Sergio Gutiérrez (1993–94)
  Julio García (1994–95)
  Hugo Cicamois (1995–96)
  Eugenio Horta (1996)
  Esaú Bravo (1996)
  Pedro Araya (1997)
  Roberto Ortiz (1998)
  Carlos Encinas (1998)
  Manuel Alvarado (1999)
  Luis Urrutia (1999)
  Eugenio Jara (2000)
  John Castro (2000)
  Hugo Cicamois (2001)
  Enzo Silva (2001)
  Ramón Castro (2002)
  Esaú Bravo (2002–03)
  Alex Barrales (2003)
  Jaime Nova (2004–05)
  Eduardo Cortázar (2005–06)
  Nelson Mores (2006)
  Germán Cornejo (2007)
  Juan Ubilla (2007)
  Luis Marcoleta (2008–10)
  Raúl Toro (2010–11)
  Juan Aliaga (2011)
  Eduardo Cortázar (2011)
  Jorge Socías (2012)
  Cristián Castañeda (2012)
  Eduardo Cortázar (2012)
  Pablo Abraham (2012–13)
  Mauricio Giganti (2013)
  Germán Corengia (2014–15)
  Cristián Molins (2015)
  Luis Marcoleta (2015–2018)
  Jaime Vera (2018)
  Dalcio Giovagnoli (2019)
  Hugo Vilches (2019)
  Nicolás Larcamón (2020)
  Damián Muñoz (2020)
  Martín Palermo (2020–21)
  Damián Muñoz (2021–)

References

External links
  Curicó Unido, Official web site.
  Curicó Albirrojo, Fan site.

Football clubs in Chile
Association football clubs established in 1973
Sport in Maule Region
1973 establishments in Chile
Curicó